Ložišća is a small settlement on the west parts of the Croatian island of Brač, population 139 (2011).

References

Brač
Populated places in Split-Dalmatia County